A number of steamships have been named Marie.
 , a German cargo ship in service 1899–1923
 , a Belgian cargo ship in service 1936–48
 , a Belgian cargo ship in service 1949–50

Ship names